Term of address may refer to:

Style (form of address), an official or legally recognized form of address for a person, often used with a title
Title, one or more words used before or after a person's name
Name, a term used for identification of a person, thing, or class of things
Vocative expression, a phrase identifying the person being addressed

See also
Address (disambiguation)
Addressee (disambiguation)
Title (disambiguation)
Honorific, a title that conveys esteem, courtesy, or respect when addressing or referring to a person
T–V distinction, contextual use of different pronouns to convey formality or familiarity in some languages